Dunmore's Proclamation is a historical document signed on November 7, 1775, by John Murray, 4th Earl of Dunmore, royal governor of the British colony of Virginia. The proclamation declared martial law and promised freedom for slaves of American Patriots who left their owners and joined the British army, becoming Black Loyalists. The same right was offered to indentured servants. Most relevant historians agree that the proclamation was chiefly designed for practical rather than moral reasons.

Formally proclaimed on November 15, its publication prompted between 800 and 2000 slaves (from both Patriot and Loyalist owners) to run away and enlist with Dunmore. It also raised a furor among Virginia's slave-owning elites (again of both political persuasions), to whom the possibility of a slave rebellion was a major fear.  The proclamation ultimately failed in meeting Dunmore's objectives; he was forced out of the colony in 1776, taking about 300 former slaves with him. The 1779 Philipsburg Proclamation applied to all the colonies. During the course of the war, between 80,000 and 100,000 slaves escaped from the plantations.

Background

John Murray, 4th Earl of Dunmore, originally from Scotland, was the royal governor of the Colony of Virginia from 1771 to 1775. During his tenure, he worked proactively to extend Virginia's western borders past the Appalachian Mountains, despite the British Royal Proclamation of 1763. He notably defeated the Shawnee nation in Dunmore's War, gaining land south of the Ohio River. As a widespread dislike for the British crown (as a result of the American Revolution) became apparent, however, Dunmore changed his attitude towards the colonists; he became frustrated with the lack of respect towards the British Crown. Dunmore's popularity worsened after, following orders, he attempted to prevent the election of representatives to the Second Continental Congress.

On April 21, 1775, he seized colonial ammunition stores, an action that resulted in the formation of an angry mob. The colonists argued that the ammunition belonged to them, not to the British Crown. That night, Dunmore angrily swore, "I have once fought for the Virginians and by God, I will let them see that I can fight against them." This was one of the first instances that Dunmore overtly threatened to institute martial law. While he had not formally passed any rulings, news of his plan spread through the colony rapidly. A group of slaves offered their services to the royal governor not long after April 21. Though he ordered them away, the colonial slaveholders remained suspicious of his intentions.

As colonial protests became violent, Dunmore fled the Governor's Palace in Williamsburg and took refuge aboard the frigate HMS Fowey at Yorktown on June 8, 1775. For several months, Dunmore replenished his forces and supplies by conducting raids and inviting slaves to join him. When Virginia's House of Burgesses decided that Dunmore's departure indicated his resignation, he drafted a formal proclamation now named after him, signing it on November 7. It was publicly proclaimed a week later.

Dunmore's Proclamation

In the official document, he declared martial law and adjudged all revolutionaries as traitors to the British Crown. Furthermore, the document declared "all indentured servants, Negroes, or others...free that are able and willing to bear arms..." Dunmore expected such a revolt to have several effects. Primarily, it would bolster his own forces, which, cut off from reinforcements from British-held Boston, numbered only around 300. Secondarily, he hoped that such an action would create a fear among the colonists of a general slave uprising and would force them to abandon the revolution.

Colonial reaction
The Virginia Convention was outraged and responded on December 14, 1775, with an unambiguous declaration that all fugitive slaves would be executed:

Newspapers such as The Virginia Gazette published the proclamation in full, and patrols were organized to look for any slaves attempting to take Dunmore up on his offer. The Gazette not only criticized Dunmore for offering freedom to only those slaves belonging to revolutionaries who were willing to serve him, but also questioned whether he would be true to his word, suggesting that he would sell the escaped slaves in the West Indies. The paper therefore cautioned slaves to "Be not then...tempted by the proclamation to ruin your selves." Since very few slaves were literate, this was more a symbolic move than anything. It was also noted that Dunmore himself was a slaveholder.

On December 4, the Continental Congress recommended to Virginian colonists that they resist Dunmore "to the uttermost..." On December 13, the Virginia Convention responded in kind with a proclamation of its own, declaring that any slaves who returned to their masters within ten days would be pardoned, but those who did not would be hanged without the benefit of clergy.

Estimates of the number of slaves that reached Dunmore vary, but generally range between 800 and 2,000. The escaped slaves Dunmore accepted were enlisted into what was known as Dunmore's Ethiopian Regiment.  The only notable battle in which Dunmore's regiment participated was the Battle of Great Bridge in early December 1775, which was a decisive British loss.

Dunmore's strategy was ultimately unsuccessful as his forces were decimated by a smallpox outbreak less than a year later. When Dunmore ultimately left the colony in 1776 he took 300 of the former slaves with him.

In 1779, British General Sir Henry Clinton issued the Philipsburg Proclamation, which freed slaves owned by revolutionaries throughout the rebel states, even if they did not enlist in the British Army. It resulted in a significantly larger number of runaways.  It is estimated that up to 100,000 attempted to leave their owners and join the British over the course of the entire war.  At the end of the war, the British relocated about 3,000 former slaves to Nova Scotia.

See also
 Black Loyalist
 Emancipation Proclamation

References

Further reading
 Gilbert, Alan. Black Patriots and Loyalists: Fighting for Emancipation in the War for Independence (University of Chicago Press, 2012)
 Piecuch, Jim. Three Peoples, One King: Loyalists, Indians, and Slaves in the Revolutionary South, 1775–1782 (Univ of South Carolina Press, 2008)
 Quarles, Benjamin. "Lord Dunmore as Liberator," William and Mary Quarterly (1958) 15#4 pp. 494–507 in JSTOR

External links

 Photograph of the proclamation
 Proclamation text
 Proclamation of Earl of Dunmore from PBS
 Summary of Dunmore's Proclamation
 Dunmore's Proclamation:A Time to Choose
 Reactions of blacks to Dunmore's Proclamation
 Dunmore's Proclamation and the fear of slave revolt
 Controlling slaves after Dunmore's Proclamation
 Dunmore's Proclamation's effect on the war
 Significance of Dunmore's Proclamation

1775 documents
1775 in the Thirteen Colonies
1775 in Virginia
Documents of the American Revolution
Slavery in the United States
Colony of Virginia
Virginia in the American Revolution
Fugitive American slaves
Military emancipation in the American Revolutionary War
Governor of Virginia